{{DISPLAYTITLE:GABAA-rho receptor}}

The GABAA-rho receptor (previously known as the GABAC receptor) is a subclass of GABAA receptors composed entirely of rho (ρ) subunits. GABAA receptors including those of the ρ-subclass are ligand-gated ion channels responsible for mediating the effects of gamma-amino butyric acid (GABA), the major inhibitory neurotransmitter in the brain. The GABAA-ρ receptor, like other GABAA receptors, is expressed in many areas of the brain, but in contrast to other GABAA receptors, the GABAA-ρ receptor has especially high expression in the retina.

Nomenclature 
A second type of ionotropic GABA receptor, insensitive to typical allosteric modulators of GABAA receptor channels such as benzodiazepines and barbiturates, was designated GABAС receptor. Native responses of the GABAC receptor type occur in retinal bipolar or horizontal cells across vertebrate species.

GABAС receptors are exclusively composed of ρ (rho) subunits that are related to GABAA receptor subunits. Although the term "GABAС receptor" is frequently used, GABAС may be viewed as a variant within the GABAA receptor family. Others have argued that the differences between GABAС and GABAA receptors are large enough to justify maintaining the distinction between these two subclasses of GABA receptors. However, since GABAС receptors are closely related in sequence, structure, and function to GABAA receptors and since other GABAA receptors besides those containing ρ subunits appear to exhibit GABAС pharmacology, the Nomenclature Committee of the IUPHAR has recommended that the GABAС term no longer be used and these ρ receptors should be designated as the ρ subfamily of the GABAA receptors (GABAA-ρ).

Function 
In addition to containing a GABA binding site, the GABAA-ρ receptor complex conducts chloride ions across neuronal membranes. Binding of GABA to the receptor results in opening of this channel. When the reversal potential of chloride is less than the membrane potential, chloride ions flow down their electrochemical gradient into the cell. This influx of chloride ions lowers the membrane potential of the neuron, thus hyperpolarizes it, making it more difficult for these cells to conduct electrical impulses in the form of an action potential. Following stimulation by GABA, the chloride current produced by GABAA-ρ receptors is slow to initiate but sustained in duration. In contrast, the GABAA receptor current has a rapid onset and short duration. GABA is about 10 times more potent at GABAA-ρ than it is at most GABAA receptors.

Structure 
Like other ligand-gated ion channels, the GABAA-ρ chloride channel is formed by oligomerization of five subunits arranged about a fivefold symmetry axis to form a central ion conducting pore. To date, three GABAA-ρ receptor subunits have been identified in humans:
 ρ1
 ρ2
 ρ3
The above three subunits coassemble either to form functional homo-pentamers (ρ15, ρ25, ρ35) or hetero-pentamers (ρ1mρ2n, ρ2mρ3n where m + n = 5).

There is also evidence that ρ1 subunits can form hetero-pentameric complexes with GABAA receptor γ2 subunits.

Pharmacology 
There are several pharmacological differences that distinguish GABAA-ρ from GABAA and GABAB receptors. For example, GABAA-ρ receptors are:
 selectively activated by (+)-CAMP [(+)-cis-2-aminomethylcyclopropane-carboxylic acid] and blocked by TPMPA [(1,2,5,6-tetrahydropyridin-4-yl)methylphosphinic acid];
 not sensitive to the GABAB agonist baclofen nor the GABAA receptor antagonist bicuculline;
 not modulated by many GABAA receptor modulators such as barbiturates and benzodiazepines, but are modulated selectively by certain neuroactive steroids.

Selective Ligands

Agonists 
 CACA
 CAMP
 GABOB
 Muscimol

Antagonists 
Mixed GABAA-ρ / GABAB antagonists
 ZAPA ((Z)-3-[(Aminoiminomethyl)thio]prop-2-enoic acid)
 SKF-97541 (3-Aminopropyl(methyl)phosphinic acid)
 CGP-36742 (3-aminopropyl-n-butyl-phosphinic acid)

Selective GABAA-ρ antagonists
 TPMPA
 (±)-cis-(3-Aminocyclopentyl)butylphosphinic acid
 (S)-(4-Aminocyclopent-1-enyl)butylphosphinic acid
 N2O

Genetics 
Mutations in the ρ1 or ρ2 genes may be responsible for some cases of autosomal recessive retinitis pigmentosa.

References 

Transmembrane receptors
GABA